Whirlpool Productions is a German house music project formed in 1991 from Cologne, consisting of musicians and producers Eric D. Clark, Justus Köhncke and Hans Nieswandt.

Musical career
Whirlpool Productions are known for their unique, experimental sound that shaped the style of bands like Sensorama or Egoexpress. Their disco hit "From Disco to Disco" was a big success. In summer 1997, it was a number 1 for 9 weeks in Italy. The musicians were also journalists in the old editorial staff of Spex music magazine, and therefore were also interested in the theoretical side of their activity. Today, they appear mostly as DJs. Hans Nieswandt talks in his book Plus Minus Acht about his memories of house in the '90s.

Discography

Albums
Brian de Palma (1995)
Dense Music (1996)
??? (1998)
Lifechange (2001)

Singles
"Fly High"/"Gimme" (1993)
"I Think that Maybe I'm Dreaming" (1994) (with T'n'I under the title The Dream Team EP)
The Immunity Syndrome EP (1995)
"Non-Stop Trancin"/"Let Yourself Go" (1994)
"Harvest"/"Moon Huh" (1995)
"Cold Song" (1996)
"From Disco to Disco" (1996)
"Crazy Music" (1998)
"Lifechange" (2001)

Remixes (selection)
Die Helfende Hand - "Wo sind die Partys" (1993)
D'Cypher - "Return of Dr. Mabuse" (1993)
Microbots - "I Don't Know What to Expect" (1995)
Army of Lovers - "Life is Fantastic" (1995)

References

External links
 Article

German house music groups
Musical groups established in 1991
1991 establishments in Germany